Imidazoquinoline is a tricyclic organic molecule; its derivatives and compounds are often used for antiviral and antiallergic creams.

Derivatives
 Dactolisib
 Imiquimod
 Gardiquimod
 Resiquimod
 Sumanirole

References